Travis Jones may refer to:

 Travis Jones (American football coach) (born 1972), former American football assistant coach; former linebacker and defensive tackle
 Travis Jones (defensive lineman) (born 1999), American football defensive tackle

See also
 Travis Jonas (born 1970 or 1971), American poker dealer
 Travia Jones (born 1995), Canadian sprinter